Rossmoya is a rural locality in the Livingstone Shire, Queensland, Australia. In the  Rossmoya had a population of 65 people.

History 
Rossmoya Provisional School opened on 30 July 1923. It became Rossmoya State School circa 1926. It closed on 26 January 1968.

In the  Rossmoya had a population of 65 people.

References 

Shire of Livingstone
Localities in Queensland